was a Japanese samurai of the Azuchi-Momoyama through early Edo periods. He was the family head of the Matsui-Matsudaira, a family which received the Matsudaira name as an honorific following his father's service to Tokugawa Ieyasu. Yasushige ended his life as daimyō of Kishiwada han. There is a rumour claiming that he is Ieyasu's illegitimate son.

References
Kishiwada han on "Edo 300 HTML" (in Japanese)
Matsudaira Yasushige (in Japanese)
Brief biographical details (in Japanese)

|-

|-

|-

|-

|-

1568 births
1640 deaths
Daimyo
Matsui-Matsudaira clan